Ponnuketha Purushan is a 1992 Indian Tamil-language film, directed by Gangai Amaran. The film stars Ramarajan, Gautami, Rajeev, Sadhana and Vinu Chakravarthy. The film's score was composed by Ilaiyaraaja.

Cast
Ramarajan
Gautami
Rajeev
Sadhana
Vinu Chakravarthy
Goundamani
Senthil
Kovai Sarala

Soundtrack
The music was composed by Ilaiyaraaja.

Reception
The Indian Express gave an average review for the film and called Amaran's direction "so-so".

References

External links
 

1992 films
Indian romantic drama films
Films scored by Ilaiyaraaja
1990s Tamil-language films
Films directed by Gangai Amaran
1992 romantic drama films